The 2016 Ping An Chinese Football Association Super League was the 13th season since the establishment of the Chinese Super League. The league title sponsor was Ping An Insurance. Guangzhou Evergrande Taobao won their sixth consecutive title of the league.

The run-up to the season saw clubs spend £200 million on players.

Club changes 
Clubs promoted from 2015 China League One
 Yanbian Changbaishan F.C.
 Hebei Zhongji F.C.
Clubs relegated to 2016 China League One
 Guizhou Renhe F.C.
 Shanghai Shenxin F.C.

Name changes 
 Hebei Zhongji F.C. changed their name to Hebei China Fortune F.C. in December 2015.
 Jiangsu Guoxin Sainty F.C. changed their name to Jiangsu Suning F.C. in December 2015.
 Yanbian Changbaishan F.C. changed their name to Yanbian Funde F.C. in January 2016.

Clubs

Clubs and locations

Managerial changes

Foreign players
The number of foreign players is restricted to five per CSL team, including a slot for a player from AFC countries, although only four (one AFC countries player at least) can be on the field at any one time.

Players name in bold indicates the player is registered during the mid-season transfer window.

 Foreign players who left their clubs or were sent to reserve team after first half of the season.
 Ersan Gülüm has Australian citizenship and was counted as an Asian player in the Chinese Super League
 Jucilei has Palestine citizenship and was counted as an Asian player in the Chinese Super League

Hong Kong/Macau/Taiwan outfield players (Contracts signed before 1 January 2016 doesn't count on the foreign or Asian player slot in CSL)

League table

Results

Goalscorers

Top scorers
Source:

Top assists
Source:

Hat-tricks

League attendance

†

†

Awards
The awards of 2016 Chinese Super League were announced on 5 November 2016.
 Chinese Football Association Footballer of the Year:  Ricardo Goulart (Guangzhou Evergrande Taobao)
 Chinese Super League Golden Boot Winner:  Ricardo Goulart (Guangzhou Evergrande Taobao)
 Chinese Super League Domestic Golden Boot Award:  Wu Lei (Shanghai SIPG)
 Chinese Football Association Goalkeeper of the Year:  Zeng Cheng (Guangzhou Evergrande Taobao)
 Chinese Football Association Young Player of the Year:  Li Xiaoming (Henan Jianye)
 Chinese Football Association Manager of the Year:  Luiz Felipe Scolari (Guangzhou Evergrande Taobao)
 Chinese Football Association Referee of the Year:  Ma Ning 
 Chinese Super League Fair Play Award: Shandong Luneng Taishan, Tianjin Teda
 Chinese Super League Team of the Year (442):
GK  Zeng Cheng (Guangzhou Evergrande Taobao)
DF  Zhang Linpeng (Guangzhou Evergrande Taobao),  Kim Young-Gwon (Guangzhou Evergrande Taobao),  Feng Xiaoting (Guangzhou Evergrande Taobao),  Jiang Zhipeng (Guangzhou R&F)
MF  Ricardo Goulart (Guangzhou Evergrande Taobao),   Paulinho (Guangzhou Evergrande Taobao),  Wu Xi (Jiangsu Suning),  Wu Lei (Shanghai SIPG)
FW  Gao Lin (Guangzhou Evergrande Taobao),  Demba Ba (Shanghai Greenland Shenhua)

References

External links
Current CSL table, and recent results/fixtures at Soccerway
Chinese Super League table at FIFA
Chinese Super League official site 

Chinese Super League seasons
1
China
China